The Bulletin of the Center for Children's Books is an academic journal established in 1945 by Frances E. Henne (Graduate Library School, University of Chicago). The journal publishes reviews of the latest in children's literature in order to assist librarians and school instructors in their educational mission. The editor-in-chief is Deborah Stevenson (University of Illinois at Urbana–Champaign). The journal is published by the Johns Hopkins University Press.

See also
 
 Children's literature criticism
 Children's literature periodicals

References

External links 
 
 Journal page at publisher's website
 The Bulletin of the Center for Children's Books at Project MUSE

Literary magazines published in the United States
Book review magazines
Children's literature criticism
English-language journals
Johns Hopkins University Press academic journals
Magazines established in 1945
11 times per year journals